Dairon Manuel Pérez Pérez (born 7 January 1994) is a Cuban international football player.

International career
Pérez played three matches for the Cuba U-20's at the 2013 FIFA U-20 World Cup in Turkey.

He made his senior international debut versus Jamaica in a March 2015 friendly match. He defected with teammates Emmanuel Labrada, Frank López and Yendry Torres to the United States in October 2015 during the 2015 CONCACAF Men's Olympic Qualifying Championship.

References 

1994 births
Living people
Sportspeople from Havana
Defecting Cuban footballers
Association football forwards
Cuban footballers
Cuba international footballers
Cuba youth international footballers
FC Ciudad de La Habana players